Actinoleuca is a genus of sea snails or true limpets, marine gastropod molluscs in the family Lottiidae.

This is a southern genus and a cold-water genus.

Species
Species within this genus include:
 Actinoleuca campbelli campbelli (Filhol, 1880)
 Actinoleuca campbelli bountyensis Powell, 1955
 Actinoleuca campbelli macquariensis (Hedley, 1916)

References

 Powell A. W. B., New Zealand Mollusca, William Collins Publishers Ltd, Auckland, New Zealand 1979 
 NZ Mollusca

Lottiidae
Gastropod genera